Millus was a legendary king of the Britons as recounted by Geoffrey of Monmouth. His father was King Catellus and was succeeded by his son, Porrex II.

References

Legendary British kings